Kamil Arli is a prominent Turkish journalist and writer.

Career
He has specialised in writing about media and diplomacy.

He is the Editor in Digital Review.

He published many articles about technologies.

He wrote a book with 3 languages analysing Turkish media: “Freedom of the Turkish Press: Events and Photographs 2014” in 2015.
 
He also published a Media report with Journalist Suat Ozcelik.

He came to the Meydan from the Feza Media Group, where he was the Media Correspondent of the Newspaper. This Media Institution was closed later on  </ref>. He knows Turkish (native), English (advanced), German (advanced) Albanian (basic)

References

Living people
Turkish journalists
Writers from Istanbul
Year of birth missing (living people)